Anarta deserticola is a moth of the family Noctuidae. It was described by George Hampson in 1905. It is found along the coast of North Africa (from Egypt to Morocco) and on Malta.

The wingspan is about 36 mm. The forewings are white, suffused and irrorated (sprinkled) with red brown. The hindwings are white, the terminal area tinged with rufous. Adults are on wing from October to November.

References

External links
"Anarta deserticola (Hampson, 1905)". Insecta.pro. Retrieved October 19, 2018.

deserticola
Moths described in 1905
Taxa named by George Hampson
Moths of Europe
Moths of Africa